Priscilla Chan (born 1985) is an American pediatrician and philanthropist.

Priscilla Chan may also refer to:

 Priscilla Chan (singer) (born 1965), Hong Kong singer

See also
 Priscelia Chan (born 1978), Singaporean television actress and host